Joseph Todd (born January 1, 1979) is a former Arena Football defensive specialist. In the 2006 season, Todd led the Arizona Rattlers in tackles with 53.

Todd attended Mississippi Valley State University, where he was a star in football and track and field.

References

External links
 Stats

1979 births
Living people
People from Pascagoula, Mississippi
American football safeties
Mississippi Valley State Delta Devils football players
Grand Rapids Rampage players
Philadelphia Soul players
Players of American football from Mississippi
Arizona Rattlers players